George August was the Count of Erbach-Schönberg and an Imperial counselor.

Biography
He was the youngest son of George Albert II, Count of Erbach-Fürstenau and Countess Anna Dorothea of Hohenlohe-Waldenburg. He was born on Sunday 17 June 1691 in Waldenburg. Georg died on Wednesday 29 March 1758 in Konig, aged 66.

Family
At the age of 28, Georg married Ferdinande Henriette, Countess of Stolberg-Gedern, aged 20, on Friday 15 December 1719 in Gedern. She was born on Friday 2 October 1699 in Gedern, daughter of Ludwig Christian of Stolberg-Wernigerode and Duchess Christine of Mecklenburg-Güstrow. Ferdinande died on Saturday 31 January 1750 in Erbach, aged 50.

Issue
Countess Christine of Erbach-Schonberg (b. Schönberg, Starkenburg, Hesse-Darmstadt, 5 May 1721 – d. Eschleiz, Reuss-Juengere-Linie, Thuringia, 26 November 1769), married in Schönberg on 2 October 1742 to Heinrich XII, Count of Reuss-Schleiz (Schleiz 15 May 1716-Kirschkau 25 June 1784).
Georg Ludwig II, Count of Erbach-Schonberg (b. Schönberg, 27 January 1723 – d. Plön, Holstein, 11 February 1777), married in Plön on 11 November 1764 to Duchess Friederike of Schleswig-Holstein-Sonderburg-Plön (1736–1769).
Count Franz Karl of Erbach (b. Schönberg, 28 July 1724 – d. Schönberg, 29 September 1788), married in Bergheim, Oberhesse, Hesse-Darmstadt on 4 September 1778 to Countess Auguste Karoline of Ysenburg und Büdingen zu Büdingen.
Christian Adolf, Count of Erbach (b. Gedern, 23 August 1725 – d. Gedern, 29 March 1726).
Countess Karoline Ernestine of Erbach-Schönberg  (b. Gedern, 20 August 1727 – d. Ebersdorf, 22 April 1796), married Heinrich XXIV, Count Reuss-Ebersdorf, on 28 June 1754 in Thurnau, Bavaria.
Count Christian of Erbach (b. Gedern, 7 October 1728 – d. Mergentheim, 29 May 1799).
Countess Auguste Friederike of Erbach (b. Schönberg, 20 March 1730 – d. Thurnau, 5 September 1801), married in Schönberg on 13 September 1753 to Christian Count of Giech-Wolfstein.
Count Georg August of Erbach (b. Schönberg, 9 March 1731 – d. König, 8 February 1799).
Count Karl of Erbach-Schonberg (b. Schönberg, 10 February 1732 – d. Schönberg, 29 July 1816) married in Cernetice, Strakonice, Bohemia then Habsburg monarchy, now Czech Republic, on 1 July 1783 to Maria Johanna Nepomucena Zadubsky von Schönthal.
Count Friedrich of Erbach (b. Schönberg, 22 January 1733 – d. Schönberg, 6 April 1733).
Countess Louise Leonore of Erbach (b. Schönberg, 26 August 1735 – d. Schönberg, 23 January 1816), married on 6 July 1750 to Leopold Casimir, Count of Rechteren.
Count Kasimir of Erbach (b. Schönberg, 27 September 1736 – d. Prague, Bohemia then Habsburg monarchy, now Czech Republic, 6 April 1760).
Count Gustav Ernst of Erbach-Schönberg  (b. Schönberg, 27 April 1739 – d. Zwingenberg, 17 February 1812), married in Rottleberode on 3 August 1753 to Countess Henriette of Stolberg-Stolberg.

House of Erbach-Schönberg
Counts of Germany
1691 births
1758 deaths